Himalayan Art Resources (HAR) website is a "virtual museum" of Himalayan and Tibetan art, cataloging and exhibiting images of art (painting, sculpture, textiles, ritual objects, murals, etc.) from museum, university and private collections throughout the world. The website is hosted at the Rubin Museum of Art.

History
Himalayan Art Resources started out as a digital library known as the Tibet Art Project. The website was created with funding from the Shelley & Donald Rubin Foundation in 1997, as an education and research database of Himalayan Art. Since 1998, Jeff Watt, a Himalayan and Tibetan art scholar, has been the director and chief Curator of the HAR website.

By 2013 the website included about than 45,000 images from public and private collections; this number more than doubled by 2018, and included images from about 1000 collections and repositories.

Scholars of Himalayan art make regular use of the web site during their research. The site also makes available hundreds of resources for educational and interpretation purposes. These include curriculum, essays, glossaries, and organizational outlines to help the user navigate the material on the site.

References

External links

Virtual art museums and galleries
Tibetan art
East Asian art
Discipline-oriented digital libraries
Geographic region-oriented digital libraries
Internet properties established in 1997
American digital libraries
Himalayan art